Gandhinagar Gymkhana is a multi purpose stadium in Gandhinagar, Gujarat. The ground is mainly used for organizing matches of football, cricket and other sports.  The stadium has hosted a first-class matches in 1976 when Gujarat cricket team played against Baroda cricket team. The stadium has hosted non-first-class matches.

References

External links 
 cricketarchive
 cricinfo
 Wikimapia

Sports venues in Gujarat
Buildings and structures in Gandhinagar
Cricket grounds in Gujarat
Defunct cricket grounds in India
Sports venues completed in 1978
1978 establishments in Gujarat
20th-century architecture in India